On the Job is a six-part Philippine miniseries created by Erik Matti and Michiko Yamamoto for HBO Asia Originals. It was adapted from the two On the Job films: the 2013 film and its sequel The Missing 8, both of which are directed by Matti. Additionally, the first two episodes are a re-edited and remastered version of the first film.

It premiered on HBO Go on September 12, 2021.

Premise 
An official premise from HBO Go:

Cast

Main

Recurring
Introduced in On the Job (2013)

Introduced in The Missing 8 (2021)

Ricky Davao, William Martinez, Vandolph Quizon, Eric Fructuoso, and Ina Feleo are all cast in unspecified roles.

Production
While The Missing 8 was initially planned to have an official theatrical release both domestically and internationally, continuous closures of movie theaters across the Philippines at that time amidst the COVID-19 pandemic has placed the film's distribution process in limbo. Director Erik Matti once said that he and his crew did consider splitting the film in two parts during post-production to reduce pacing issues and to ease local audiences' viewing experience once movie theaters in the Philippines re-open during the pandemic. He also stated that they have the option of turning the film into a four-episode series and selling it to television distributors or streaming services should the film fail to secure a theatrical release.

In August 2021, WarnerMedia Asia acquired the distribution rights to the sequel and the first film. Matti was then commissioned to re-edit the films into a six-part HBO Asia original miniseries; with this, he was able to recycle all unused and deleted scenes from the first film, creating a director's cut, which will be released as the first two episodes on its Asian subsidiary streaming service HBO Go.

Release
On the Job was released as HBO Asia original miniseries on its streaming service HBO Go. The first three episodes were released on September 12, 2021, with subsequent episodes released in Sundays till October 3, 2021.

Episodes

Awards and nominations

References

HBO Asia original programming
2021 Philippine television series debuts
2021 Philippine television series endings
Philippine crime television series
Philippine action television series
Philippine political television series
Philippine thriller television series
Political thriller television series
Philippine television miniseries
Films directed by Erik Matti